Jonita Gandhi (born October 23, 1989) is a Canadian playback singer of Indian descent. She has recorded songs predominantly in Hindi and Tamil languages with few in Punjabi, Telugu, Marathi, Gujarati, Bengali, Kannada and Malayalam languages. Some of her most acclaimed songs include The Breakup Song, Mental Manadhil, Chellama and Arabic Kuthu. She is also well known for her YouTube presence. Her singing debut started through Chennai Express title track (in 2013).

Personal life 
Gandhi was born in a Punjabi family from Delhi. Her family emigrated to Brampton, Canada when she was nine months old, where she was raised. Her family later settled in Mississauga.

Gandhi studied in Turner Fenton Secondary School and attended the Ivey Business School of the University of Western Ontario where she completed her degrees in health science and business in 2012. She has had formal training in Western and Hindustani classical singing.

Career 

Gandhi grew up around music as both her father and brother were part time musicians. They would often perform cover songs together at live community events. At age 16, she auditioned for Canadian Idol but didn't get past the audition rounds. She began making YouTube covers from her bedroom, sometimes featuring other local musicians including Akash Gandhi. The videos quickly went viral and led to a myriad of opportunities to perform. Her hits on YouTube began with covers of well-known Hindi-film songs, such as, Pani Da Rang, Tujhko Jo Paaya, Tum Hi Ho, Suhaani Raat, Yeh Honsla and many others. Her beginning concerts typically consisted of these covers.

Her jump to playback singing began with an opportunity to perform alongside Sonu Nigam. This tour crossed various countries including Russia, UK, US and the Caribbean. Afterwards, her sights were set on starting a career in the Bollywood music industry. Gandhi started playback singing with Chennai Express. The music for this film was composed by Vishal–Shekhar. She further worked in other Bollywood movies like Highway, singing both Kahaan Hoon Main and Implosive Silence.

Gandhi worked as a playback singer with music directors including A. R. Rahman and Pritam. Rahman featured Gandhi in the concert film One Heart (film). Gandhi performed at the 2016 Jubilee Games in Dubai with Salim–Sulaiman and with Amit Trivedi on MTV Unplugged.

In 2020, Jonita Gandhi was involved in mentoring and judging the Indian kids singing reality show Taare Zameen Par on StarPlus

As of 2021, Gandhi is set to make her film debut with director Vignesh Shivan's Tamil film Walking/Talking Strawberry Icecream, starring Krishnakumar Balasubramanian.

Discography 
List of songs recorded by Gandhi. The list includes tracks recorded for film and non-film albums.

Filmography

References

External links 

Official Website

Living people
1989 births
Canadian playback singers
Canadian women singers
Singers from Delhi
Women musicians from Delhi
Indian emigrants to Canada
Musicians from Brampton
Punjabi people
Canadian musicians of Indian descent
Canadian people of Punjabi descent
University of Western Ontario alumni
Punjabi singers
Bollywood playback singers
Tamil playback singers
Telugu playback singers
Kannada playback singers
Bengali playback singers
Gujarati playback singers
Malayalam playback singers
Expatriate musicians in India
Canadian expatriates in India
Canadian YouTubers
21st-century Canadian singers
21st-century Canadian women singers